Cemlyn is a village in Anglesey, in north-west Wales. It lies near Cemlyn Bay. It is in the community of Cylch-y-Garn.

References

Villages in Anglesey
Cylch-y-Garn